Yerokhovo is a rural locality (a village) in Belokrestskoye Rural Settlement, Chagodoshchensky District, Vologda Oblast, Russia. The population was 44 as of 2002.

Geography 
Belye Kresty is the nearest rural locality.

References 

Rural localities in Chagodoshchensky District